Sir Graham MacGregor Bull  (30 January 1918 – 14 November 1987) was a South African-British physician, nephrologist, medical administrator, and director of medical research.

Biography
Graham MacGregor Bull grew up in South Africa. After education at Cape Town's Diocesan College, he attended the University of Cape Town, where he graduated MB ChB in 1939. After briefly engaging in general practice, he was appointed tutor and medical assistant at the Groote Schuur Hospital. 

In 1947, the South African Council for Scientific and Industrial Research awarded him a travelling fellowship, enabling him to study in London at the Hammersmith Hospital's Royal Postgraduate Medical School, where he graduated MD in 1947 with thesis Postural Proteinuria. 

Cardiologist Sir John McMichael appointed him to a lectureship at the school of medicine in Hammersmith. Shortly after the end of WWII, Willem Johan Kolff, the famous pioneer of hemodialysis, donated artificial kidney machines to institutions in Poland, as well as Amsterdam and London. Kolff briefly worked at Hammersmith to set up an artificial kidney machine with the rheumatologist Eric Bywaters and the nephrologist A. Mark 'Jo' Joekes. Bull joined the team of Bywaters and Joekes working on renal therapies. When Bywaters left in 1947 to become a medical director in Buckinghamshire, Bull became the leader of the renal unit at Hammersmith.

Bull was appointed in 1952 to a professorial chair of medicine at Queen's University, Belfast (that institution's first such professorship). He directed the establishment of record linking systems among hospitals and general practitioners and also supported Belfast's flying ambulance service for heart attack victims. He helped to establish a department of medical statistics and served as chair of the Northern Ireland Hospital Authority's committees for medical education and research. 

In 1955, he delivered the Goulstonian Lectures on The Uræmias.

Bull was appointed in 1966 director of the Medical Research Council’s new clinical research centre at Northwick Park in northwest London. He served on several committees for medical advice and investigation. In 1970 he became a member of the executive council of the Ciba Foundation and was a trustee from 1979 until his death.

Bull was elected FRCP in 1954 and was knighted in 1976. He retired in 1978. In 1988 the Sir Graham Bull Memorial Prize was founded at the Royal College of Physicians.

Family
Graham and Megan Bull had four children: a daughter who became a consulting paediatric cardiologist, and three sons who became, respectively, an accountant, a zoologist and a musician.

Bull regime
J. G. G. Borst in Amsterdam and Bull and his colleagues in London based their dietary therapy on 3 principles: (1) restrict the patient's intake of fluid to precisely balance the patient's output of fluid; (2) eliminate the patient's dietary protein and provide adequate calories to reduce the patient's endogenous breakdown of proteins; (3) give the patient no electrolytes except to replace known losses. Bull achieved these 3 objectives by feeding the patient a carefully measured, synthetic 'diet' consisting of glucose, peanut oil, and water.

References

1918 births
1987 deaths
20th-century British medical doctors
British nephrologists
Alumni of Diocesan College, Cape Town
University of Cape Town alumni
Academics of Queen's University Belfast
Knights Bachelor
Fellows of the Royal College of Physicians
British people in British Burma
British expatriates in South Africa